Weston Lock is a canal lock situated on the River Avon, on the western outskirts of Bath, England, in what now forms the Newbridge suburb of Bath.

The first cargo of 'Deal boards, Pig-Lead and Meal' arrived in Bath in December 1727. The navigation is now administered by the Canal & River Trust.

Weston cut is a man-made channel, opened in 1727, for boats to approach and pass through Weston lock, which created an island between the cut and the river weir, which became known as Dutch Island named after the owner of the brass mill established on the river side in the early 18th century.

The Dolphin Inn (later becoming the Locksbrook Inn) next to the lock was built for bargees in 1728. It is a Grade II listed building.

References

See also

Locks on the Kennet and Avon Canal

1727 establishments in England
Buildings and structures in Bath, Somerset
History of Bath, Somerset
Transport in Bath, Somerset
Locks on the Kennet and Avon Canal